Amir Khan vs. Zab Judah'', billed as "Attack & Conquer", was a professional boxing match contested on July 23, 2011 for the WBA (Super) and IBF light welterweight championship.BBC Sport – Amir Khan to defend WBA title against Zab Judah. BBC News. Retrieved on 2011-06-02.

 Build-up 
Amir Khan and Zab Judah started the build-up via a war of words on Twitter. The two fought in Las Vegas on 23 July, when the both put their titles on the line, Khan his WBA belt, Judah his IBF.

At the weigh-in Khan and Judah both made weight weighing in on the 140 lbs limit.

The fight
The fight was televised on the pay-per-view channel Primetime (UK) with commentary on BBC 5 Live and BBC Sport website and HBO. Amir Khan started the fight with a left jab. Round 1 saw a busy Amir Khan as he fought from the outside and kept Judah away with jabs and straights. All four rounds were taken by Khan. Ultimately on the 5th round Zab was taken down with a right uppercut to the body, in which at first commentators believed it was a low blow, since Judah was showing signs of agonizing pain, but when it was seen from a different camera angle, it was right on the belt, leading to a Knockout for Amir Khan. He held the IBF and WBA Light Welterweight titles until a controversial defeat at the hands of Lamont Peterson.

Main cardJunior Welterweight Championship bout  Amir Khan vs.  Zab Judah
Khan defeats Judah via knockout at 2:47 of fifth round, unifying WBA and IBF 140-lbs titles.Middleweight bout  Peter Quillin vs.  Jason LeHoullier
Quillin defeats LeHoullier via technical knockout at 1:38 of fifth round

UntelevisedFeatherweight bout  Gary Russell Jr. vs.  Eric Estrada
Russell Jr. defeats Estrada via unanimous decision. (80-71, 80-71, 80-71) Middleweight bout  James Kirkland vs.  Alexis Hloros
Kirkland defeats Hloros via technical knockout at 0:25 of second roundFeatherweight bout  Ronny Rios vs.  Noe Lopez Jr.
Rios defeated Lopez Jr. via technical knockout at 1:12 of first roundSuper Middleweight bout  Josiah Judah vs.  Rafael Jastrzebski
Judah defeats Jastrzebski via majority decision. (59-55, 58-56, 57-57) Heavyweight bout  Bryant Jennings vs.  Theron Johnson
Jennings defeats Johnson via unanimous decision. (60-53, 59-54, 60-53) Lightweight bout  Jamie Kavanagh vs.  Marcos Herrera
Kavanagh defeats Herrera via unanimous decision. (59-54, 60-54, 60-53)

Reported fight earnings
US earnings: Amir Khan ($1,072,500) vs. Zab Judah''' ($500,000)
UK earnings: Amir Khan (share of UK pay-per-view earnings)
US viewership: 1.417 million

International broadcasting

References

External links
Khan vs. Zab Judah Official Fight Card from BoxRec

Boxing matches
2011 in boxing
Boxing in Las Vegas
2011 in sports in Nevada
Boxing on HBO
Golden Boy Promotions
Amir Khan (boxer)
July 2011 sports events in the United States